Rudolf von Habsburg (5 September 1919 – 15 May 2010) was the sixth child and youngest son of Emperor Charles I of Austria and Zita of Bourbon-Parma.

Early life
He was born in Prangins, Switzerland, where the former Austrian Imperial family were staying after they had been sent into exile. He was named after Rudolf IV, Duke of Austria.

Educated with his siblings first in Spain then in Belgium, but Rudolf was expelled in 1946 once his membership in the formerly imperial House of Habsburg was exposed. After the war he travelled to the United States, Canada and the Belgian Congo.

Rudolf worked as a Wall Street junior executive and a bank director.

First marriage
Rudolf was married by Archbishop Fulton Sheen to Countess Xenia Czernichev-Besobrasov the daughter of Count Sergei Aleksandrovich Czernyshev-Besobrasov and Countess Elizabeta Dmitrievna Sheremeteva, on 22 June 1953 at Tuxedo Park, New York. They had four children. Xenia was killed in a car crash on 20 September 1968, in which Rudolf was also seriously injured.

Archduchess Maria Anna Charlotte Zita Elisabeth Regina Therese of Austria (b. 1954) married Prince Peter Galitzine (b. 1955); on 24 November 1981. They have six children:
Princess Xenia Petrovna Galitzine (23 May 1983), married Alberto Matta y Maya (b. 1983) on 23 September 2007. They have three children.
Princess Tatiana Petrovna Galitzine (16 August 1984), married Guillermo Sierra y Uribe (13 June 1984) on 29 April 2017. They have one son.
Princess Alexandra Petrovna Galitzine (7 August 1986)
Princess Maria Petrovna Galitzine (11 May 1988 – 4 May 2020) she married Rishi Roop Singh (b. 1978) on 24 September 2017. They have one son.
Maxim (10 February 2018)
Prince Dimitri Petrovich Galitzine (11 June 1990)
Prince Ioann Teimouraz Petrovich Galitzine (27 May 1992)
Archduke Karl Peter Otto Serge Joseph Paul Leopold Heinrich of Austria (5 November 1955) married Princess Alexandra von Wrede (12 May 1970). They have two children.
Archduke Simeon Carl Eugen Joseph Leopold  of Austria (29 June 1958) married Princess María of Bourbon-Two Sicilies (b. 1967) on 13 July 1996. They have five children.
Archduke Johannes Karl Ludwig Clemens Maria Joseph Markus d'Aviano Leopold  of Austria (11 December 1962 – 29 June 1975)

Second marriage
Rudolf was married secondly to Princess Anna Gabriele von Wrede (11 September 1940) on 15 October 1971 in Ellingen, Bavaria. They have one daughter.

Archduchess Catharina-Maria Johanna Zita Sophie Caspara (14 September 1972) married Count Massimiliano Secco di Aragona (b. 1967); on 9 December 1998. They have three sons.

Death
Rudolph died on 15 May 2010. He was survived by two older brothers; Otto and Felix.

Ancestry

References

1919 births
2010 deaths
House of Habsburg-Lorraine
Knights of the Golden Fleece of Austria
Austrian princes
Swiss emigrants to Belgium
Sons of emperors
Children of Charles I of Austria
Sons of kings